Llewellyn Frost Haskell (born Thomas Frost Haskell; October 8, 1842 – November 26, 1929) was a Union Army officer during the American Civil War.

Life
Born in Belleville, New Jersey, he was originally named Thomas Frost Haskell. His father was Llewellyn Solomon Haskell, druggist, landscape gardener and founder of Llewellyn Park in West Orange, New Jersey. Around 1862, his father requested he change his first name to Llewellyn for family reasons after joining the army. His name change was later ratified by an 1873 act of the legislature of the State of New Jersey. Records from his service use both names.

Haskell was receiving his education in Heidelberg, Germany when he decided to return in 1861, and enlisted in the 14th New York Volunteer Infantry Regiment as a private. He fought at the First Battle of Bull Run where he sustained slight wounds and sunstroke. He later served as second Lieutenant Colonel in the 5th Missouri Volunteer Infantry and the 27th Missouri Volunteer Infantry building forts. He also served as an aide to General Alexander Asboth at the Battle of Pea Ridge and General Henry Prince at the Battle of Cedar Mountain (also known as Slaughter's Mountain), where he was severely wounded in the thigh by a minié ball. Haskell was the only member of General Prince's staff to escape with his life; he was hospitalized for four months after the battle.

In October, 1863, he was made Lieutenant Colonel of the 7th United States Colored Infantry and later promoted to the command of the 41st United States Colored Infantry, both colored regiments under the Bureau of Colored Troops. With the 41st USCT, Haskell engaged in the Siege of Petersburg and Appomattox Campaign and was present at the surrender of Confederate General Robert E. Lee and the Army of Northern Virginia at Appomattox Court House on April 9, 1865. By the end of the war, he had risen to the rank of Brevet Brigadier General of volunteers.

After the war, he helped his father develop Llewellyn Park and later settled in San Francisco, California in 1877, where he engaged in furniture manufacturing, and also In mining and oil development. 
He married Emmeline "Emma" A. Gllmore (1849–1925) on June 4, 1868, at Llewellyn Park, in an open air ceremony. The couple had two sons Llewellen F. (born January 9, 1870) and Olcott (born February 13, 1873).
He died in San Rafael, California, on November 26, 1929, and his remains were cremated.

References

Bibliography

1842 births
1929 deaths
People of New York (state) in the American Civil War
Union Army colonels
People from Belleville, New Jersey
People from West Orange, New Jersey
People from San Rafael, California
People of New Jersey in the American Civil War
Businesspeople from California
Businesspeople from New Jersey
Military personnel from California